Henri-Corentin Buysse (born 18 March 1988) is a French ice hockey player for Gothiques d'Amiens and the French national team.

He represented France at the 2019 IIHF World Championship.

References

External links

1988 births
Living people
Ducs de Dijon players
French ice hockey goaltenders
Gothiques d'Amiens players
Sportspeople from Amiens